Jeju Cho clan is one of the Korean clans. Their Bon-gwan was in Jeju Province. According to the research held in 1985, the number of the Jeju Cho clan was 30. Their founder was  who came to Korea during the Goryeo and Yuan dynasty period and settled in Jeju Island. Their surname was originally Jo（）, but they changed it into Cho（） clan the 10 th generation before. The document named Joseon Ssijok Tongbo recorded Jeju Cho clan as surrenderer of Yuan dynasty.

See also 
 Korean clan names of foreign origin

References

External links 
 

 
Korean clan names of Chinese origin
Cho clans